The 2023 season will be the Los Angeles Rams' upcoming 86th in the National Football League, their 87th overall, their 57th in the Greater Los Angeles Area, the fourth playing their home games at SoFi Stadium and their seventh under head coach Sean McVay. They will attempt to improve on their 5-12 record from the previous season and make the playoffs again after a one-year absence. For the first time since they made it to Super Bowl LIII in the 2018 season, Jalen Ramsey will not be on the roster, as they traded him to the Miami Dolphins.

Offseason

Coaching changes
Following considerable press speculation that he was likely to step away following his first losing season as head coach, Sean McVay announced that he would return in 2023 for his seventh season with the Rams.
The Rams announced that they were terminating the contracts of several assistants. Among those who were not being retained were offensive line coach Kevin Carberry, defensive backs coach Jonathan Cooley,  special teams coordinator Joe DeCamillis, assistant defensive line coach Skyler Jones and defensive assistant Lance Schulters.
Additionally, offensive coordinator Liam Coen voluntarily resigned to return to the University of Kentucky, where he had previously served as offensive coordinator.
Former New York Jets offensive coordinator Mike LaFleur was hired by the Rams for the same position. Mike LaFleur's older brother Matt LaFleur, now head coach of the Green Bay Packers, served in the same capacity in 2017, during Sean McVay's first season as Rams head coach.
Nick Caley, who had spent the previous six seasons as tight ends coach of the New England Patriots, was hired to take on the same role with the Rams.

Draft

Staff

Current roster

Preseason
The Rams' preseason opponents and schedule will be announced in the spring.

Regular season

2023 opponents
Listed below are the Rams' opponents for 2023. Exact dates and times will be announced in the spring.

References

External links
 

Los Angeles Rams
Los Angeles Rams seasons
Los Angeles Rams
2023 in Los Angeles